Yohimban is a chemical compound. It is the base chemical structure of various alkaloids in the Rauvolfia and Corynanthe plant genera, including yohimbine, rauwolscine, corynanthine, ajmalicine, reserpine, deserpidine, and rescinnamine, among others.

References 

Tryptamine alkaloids
Quinolizidine alkaloids
Heterocyclic compounds with 5 rings